Micrurapteryx caraganella is a moth of the family Gracillariidae. It is found in Siberia, and possibly Tajikistan and the Russian Far East.

The wingspan is 8.7–10.2 mm. The forewings are dark brown in ground colour with white markings. The costal margin with five white strigulae, the first four curving outwards, the fifth inwards, the first long and strongly oblique, the fourth often indistinct. The dorsal margin with basal two-thirds white, this fascia denticulate inwards, often linked irregularly with the costal strigulae. The apical spot is black with some mixture of paler scales, surrounded by a circular white line including the fifth costal strigula. The hindwings are as in Micrurapteryx gradatella.

The larvae feed on Caragana arborescens, Caragana frutex, Caragana boisii and Medicago sativa. They mine the leaves of their host plant. The mine is a roundish or slightly branched blotch above the midrib. Often a long, narrow tunnel is visible on the lower surface of the leaf. The mine quickly develops into an upper-surface flat blotch with digitate channels, occupying half or an entire leaflet.

Gallery

References

Gracillariinae
Moths of Europe
Moths described in 1957